Hobart Town Hall is a landmark sandstone building which serves as seat of the City of Hobart local government area, hosting council meetings as well as acting as public auditorium that can be hired from the council. It is also open to periodic public tours, featuring its ornate Victorian auditorium and the Town Hall organ which has been in use since 1870.

History

Construction of the town hall was begun in 1864, with the foundation stone laid on April 14, which was declared a public holiday and celebrated by a parade. It was completed two years later in September 1866, which was celebrated by another public holiday and a gala ball. The design by Henry Hunter was somewhat inspired by the Palazzo Farnese in Rome. At the time of construction, it was designed to house the City of Hobart's council chambers, as well as police offices, the municipal court and the State Library of Tasmania. These remained in use for nearly fifty years after the town hall was opened. It, along with Franklin Square, were built on the site of the former government house which had been demolished upon completion of the present government house.

By 1925 the state of the halls prominent portico had degenerated to the point it was declared unsafe and major restoration work had to be undertaken.

The building's well-known chandeliers were installed in the Town Hall's ballroom by former Lord Mayor Doone Kennedy.

References

External links

 Historic images of the Town Hall on the Tasmanian Electoral Commission website

Landmarks in Hobart
Henry Hunter buildings
Town halls in Tasmania
Tasmanian Heritage Register
Macquarie Street, Hobart